La Hiedra (born May 18, 1997) is a Mexican luchadora enmascarada, or masked professional wrestler currently signed to Lucha Libre AAA Worldwide (AAA), where she was formerly one third of the AAA World Trios Champions with Rey Escorpion and Texano Jr. La Hiedra's real name is not a matter of public record, as is often the case with masked wrestlers in Mexico where their private lives are kept a secret from the wrestling fans. La Hiedra is a second-generation wrestler, the daughter of Sangre Chicana.

Professional wrestling career

Independent circuit (2011-2014)
La Hiedra was originally trained by her father, Sangre Chicana before making her professional wrestling debut on November 14, 2010. La Hiedra made his debut on the independent circuit where defeated Amazona, La Hechicera and Rey Tornado. On September 16, 2011 in  LLF Remembrance , La Hiedra was defeated before Lady Puma in an individual single. On October 2, 2011, La Hiedra along with La Bandida was defeated before Princess Maya.

On November 6, 2011, La Hiedra made her debut in Promociones Cantu as part of AAA where she teamed with Mari Apache and Street Boy where they defeated Black Mamba, Lady Puma and La Hechicera.

Lucha Libre AAA Worldwide (2015–present)
On June 1, 2015, La Hiedra made her debut for AAA, one of Mexico's largest wrestling promotions. In her first AAA match she teamed up with El Hijo de Pirata Morgan, La Parka Negra and Taya Valkyrie, defeated to El Elegido, Faby Apache, Perseus & Pimpinela Escarlata. La Hiedra, along with Lady Shani, Goya Kong and Lady Maravilla were all unsuccessful in their efforts to win the Reina de Reinas championship from Taya Valkyrie at the Héroes Inmortales IX show, La Hiedra's first championship match in AAA. On November 6, 2015, she teamed up with Mamba, losing to Goya Kong and Pimpinela Escarlata. On March 19, 2017, La Hiedra competed in a fight to be to #1 Contender for the AAA Reina de Reinas Championship, losing to Ayako Hamada.

On August 26 at Triplemanía XXVI, La Hiedra teamed up with Angelikal for the AAA World Mixed Tag Team Championship against El Hijo del Vikingo and Vanilla, Dinastía and Lady Maravilla and Niño Hamburguesa and Big Mami, where they managed to retain their titles.

Personal life
La Hiedra is the daughter of professional wrestler Andrés Durán Reyes, better known under the ring name Sangre Chicana ("Chicano Blood"), the sister of Sangre Chicana Jr. and half sister of Lluvia. Unlike her father and brother, La Hiedra decided to work as a tecnico while her father was one of the most famous rulebreakers (also known as a rudo) of the 1980s. She is the niece of wrestler Herodes and the cousin of wrestler Herodes Jr.

Championships and accomplishments
 DDT Pro-Wrestling
 Ironman Heavymetalweight Championship (1 time)
Lucha Libre AAA Worldwide
AAA World Trios Championship (1 time) – with Rey Escorpión, Taurus and Texano Jr.
Pro Wrestling Illustrated
Ranked No. 257 of the top 500 singles wrestlers in the PWI 500 in 2021
Promociones EMW
EMW World Women's Championship (1 time, current)

References

1997 births
Living people
Mexican female professional wrestlers
Masked wrestlers
Professional wrestlers from Tamaulipas
Sportspeople from Nuevo Laredo
AAA World Trios Champions
Ironman Heavymetalweight Champions
21st-century professional wrestlers